The Naval Academy was an educational institution based in Vlorë, Albania. It trained officers and non-commissioned officers in the Albanian Navy. Over 1000 cadets graduated from the academy.

History 
It was established on 4 September 1961 as the first naval school in the nation, which was then the People's Republic of Albania. It was originally called the School of Navy Officers. It was formed from the first 70 Albanian naval students who returned from the Soviet Union studying at institutions of the Soviet Navy in cities like Baku, Sevastopol, Riga and Leningrad. The building was damaged during the Albanian Civil War in 1997, only being rebuilt in 1998. It was closed in July 2007 by order of the Ministry of Defense. In 2019, the Albanian government decided to change the ownership of the facility's remnants from the Ministry of Defense to the Municipality of Vlora, in accordance with a decision of February 2017.

Alumni 

 Kristaq Gerveni, Representative of Albania in NATO.

See also 

 Nikola Vaptsarov Naval Academy
 Italian Naval Academy
 Hellenic Naval Academy

References 

Educational institutions established in 1961
Military academies of Albania
1961 establishments in Albania